Darling Downs Correctional Centre was an Australian prison facility in Toowoomba, Queensland, Australia.

See also

 List of Australian prisons

References

https://web.archive.org/web/20070926221319/http://www.aic.gov.au/research/corrections/facilities/qld.html#darlingdowns
http://www.dcs.qld.gov.au/About_Us/The_Department/Custodial_Corrections/Darling_Downs_Correctional_Centre/index.shtml
http://www.boggoroadgaol.com.au/Timeline%20Queensland%20prisons.html
https://web.archive.org/web/20110217075908/http://www.qgd.qld.gov.au/cor003.html

Prisons in Queensland
Darling Downs